Back It Up may refer to:

Albums
 Back It Up!!, by Nils Lofgren, 1975
 Back It Up (Robin Trower album), 1983

Songs
 "Back It Up" (Caro Emerald song), 2009
 "Back It Up" (Prince Royce song), 2015
 "Back It Up", by Colette Carr from Skitszo, 2013
 "Back It Up", by Jewelry, 2011
 "Back It Up", by Seventeen from An Ode, 2019
 "Back It Up", by Swami, 2013

See also
 Backing up or reversing, a vehicle maneuver
 Backup, in information technology